MasterChef Latino is an American competitive cooking show produced in Spanish, based on the British MasterChef series.  Amateur and home chefs compete against one another for the title of MasterChef. MasterChef Latino premiered on 14 January 2018 on Telemundo. The series was hosted by Gaby Espino together with the chefs Claudia Sandoval, Ennio Carota and Benito Molina. The second season premiered on 15 April 2019 and John Pardo was among the featured candidates.

When the show returned for a third season in 2022, the judges included Adrián Herrera and Benito Molina.

See also 

 Johana Clavel

References 

MasterChef
Cooking competitions
American game shows